The 1935 New Mexico Lobos football team represented the University of New Mexico as a member of the Border Conference during the 1935 college football season. In their second season under head coach Gwinn Henry, the Lobos compiled an overall record of 6–4 record with a mark of 3–2 against conference opponents, finished third in the Border Conference, and outscored all opponents by a total of 145 to 102.

Schedule

References

New Mexico
New Mexico Lobos football seasons
New Mexico Lobos football